

Radio

The Chargers' official flagship station in 2020 is now KYSR 98.7 FM For the previous two seasons, their radio flagship was KFI 640 AM in Los Angeles, commonly known as "KFI AM 640". Chargers daily updates, and specialty shows, will continue to air on FOX Sports 570 KLAC. The broadcast team consists of Play-by-play announcer Matt "Money" Smith and former NFL scout Daniel Jeremiah comprise the broadcast team with KFI morning co-host Shannon Farren serving as sideline reporter. Past Chargers radio broadcasters have included Josh Lewin, Ralph Lawler, Stu Nahan, Tom Kelly, Lee "Hacksaw" Hamilton, Dan Rowe, Ted Leitner, Hank Bauer, and Nick Hardwick. Bauer served seventeen seasons (1998–2014) as the radio color analyst; however, the Chargers and then flagship KIOZ decided not to renew his contract, and was replaced by Curtis Conway starting with the 2015 season.

P.A. announcer

Eric Smith the public address announcer of all Clippers basketball games and former Dodgers baseball announcer games, serves as the P.A. announcer of all Charger home games at SoFi Stadium. Smith replaced legendary P.A. announcer Bruce Binkowski, who went on to become the executive director of the Holiday Bowl and Poinsettia Bowl games.

With the Chargers return to Los Angeles in 2017, the team became a beneficiary of league scheduling policies. Both the Chargers and the Los Angeles Rams share the Los Angeles market, which is on the West Coast of the United States. This means that the Chargers cannot play home games, road division games against the Denver Broncos or Oakland Raiders, or interconference road games against the NFC West (in seasons that the AFC West and NFC West meet in interconference play) in the early 10:00 a.m. Pacific time slot. In addition, they cannot play interconference home games at the same time or network as the Rams. As a result, both teams generally will have more limited scheduling options, and will also benefit by receiving more prime-time games than usual. Thus, regardless of the previous season's record, the Chargers will receive a disproportionate number of Sunday Night, Monday Night and/or Thursday Night games, compared to the rest of the league.

Previously when the team was in San Diego its main flagship was KIOZ. The previous Los Angeles flagship was KLAC/570, in Los Angeles and Orange County, which like KIOZ, KLSD, and several other Charger radio affiliates, is owned by iHeartMedia. Prior to that KSPN/710  was the Los Angeles affiliate and before that, KMPC/1540 for several years.

As of 2014, the Chargers also stream their radio broadcasts on their official mobile application (through iOS and Android devices) as well as on their website.

Radio affiliates

Chargers Radio Network

English

Spanish

References

 
Los Angeles Chargers
Los Angeles Chargers
broadcasters